The 1996 United States presidential election was the 53rd quadrennial presidential election, held on Tuesday, November 5, 1996. Incumbent Democratic President Bill Clinton defeated former Senate Majority Leader Bob Dole, the Republican nominee, and Ross Perot, the Reform Party nominee and 1992 presidential candidate.

Clinton and Vice President Al Gore were re-nominated without incident by the Democratic Party. Numerous candidates entered the 1996 Republican primaries, with Dole considered the early front-runner. Dole clinched the nomination after defeating challenges by publisher Steve Forbes and paleoconservative leader Pat Buchanan. Dole's running mate was Jack Kemp, a former Congressman and football player who had served as the Housing Secretary under President George H. W. Bush. Ross Perot, who had won 18.9% of the popular vote as an independent candidate in the 1992 election, ran as the candidate of the Reform Party. Perot received less media attention in 1996 and was excluded from the presidential debates.

Clinton's chances of winning were initially considered slim in the middle of his term, as his party had lost both the House of Representatives and the Senate in 1994 for the first time in decades. He was able to regain ground as the economy began to recover from the early 1990s recession with a relatively stable world stage. Clinton tied Dole to Newt Gingrich, the unpopular Republican Speaker of the House, and warned that Republicans would increase the deficit and slash spending on popular programs like Social Security and Medicare. Dole promised an across-the-board 15% reduction in federal income taxes and labeled Clinton as a member of the "spoiled" Baby Boomer generation. Dole's age was a persistent issue in the election, and gaffes by Dole exacerbated the issue for his campaign.

Clinton maintained a consistent polling edge over Dole, and he won re-election with a substantial margin in the popular vote and the Electoral College. Clinton became the first Democrat since Franklin D. Roosevelt to win two straight presidential elections. Dole won 40.7% of the popular vote and 159 electoral votes, while Perot won 8.4% of the popular vote. Despite Dole's defeat, the Republican Party was able to maintain majorities in both the House of Representatives and the Senate. Voter turnout was registered at 49.0%, the lowest for a presidential election since 1924. 

As of 2020, this was the last time that Kentucky, Louisiana, West Virginia, Arkansas, Missouri, and Tennessee voted for the Democratic candidate in a presidential election. It was also the last time Arizona had voted for a Democratic candidate until 2020. Five states switched party predominance in 1996 with their presidential voting: Montana, Colorado, and Georgia were flipped by Senator Dole, while Florida and Arizona were flipped by President Clinton. This is also the last time a third-party candidate finished with over 5% of the vote nationwide.

Background
In 1995, the Republican Party was riding high on the significant gains made in the 1994 mid-term elections. In those races, the Republicans, led by whip Newt Gingrich, captured the majority of seats in the House for the first time in forty years and the majority of seats in the Senate for the first time in eight years. Gingrich became Speaker of the House, while Bob Dole was elevated to Senate Majority leader.

The Republicans of the 104th Congress pursued an ambitious agenda, highlighted by their Contract with America, but were often forced to compromise with President Clinton, who wielded veto power. A budget impasse between Congress and the Clinton Administration eventually resulted in a government shutdown. Clinton, meanwhile, was praised for signing the GOP's welfare reform, and other notable bills, but was forced to abandon his own health care plan.

Democratic Party nomination

Democratic Candidates
 Bill Clinton, President of the United States
 Lyndon LaRouche, Activist from Virginia
 Jimmy Griffin, Former Mayor of Buffalo from New York

Candidates gallery

With the advantage of incumbency, Bill Clinton's path to renomination by the Democratic Party was uneventful. At the 1996 Democratic National Convention, Clinton and incumbent Vice President Al Gore were renominated with token opposition. Formerly incarcerated fringe candidate Lyndon LaRouche won a few Arkansas delegates who were barred from the convention. Jimmy Griffin, former Mayor of Buffalo, New York, mounted a brief campaign but withdrew after a poor showing in the New Hampshire primary.  Former Pennsylvania governor Bob Casey contemplated a challenge to Clinton, but health problems forced Casey to abandon a bid.

Clinton easily won primaries nationwide, with margins consistently higher than 80%.

Popular primaries vote:
 Bill Clinton (inc.) – 9,730,184 (88.5%)
 Lyndon LaRouche – 597,081 (5.4%)
 Unpledged – 423,265 (3.8%)
Convention tally:

 Bill Clinton (inc.) – 4,277
 Not voting – 12

Republican Party nomination

Republican Candidates
 Bob Dole, U.S. Senator from Kansas and Republican nominee for Vice President of the United States in 1976
 Pat Buchanan, conservative columnist from Virginia
 Steve Forbes, newspaper and magazine publisher from New York
 Lamar Alexander, former Governor of Tennessee
 Phil Gramm, U.S. Senator from Texas
 Alan Keyes, former U.S. ECOSOC Ambassador from Maryland
 Richard Lugar, U.S. Senator from Indiana
 Bob Dornan, U.S. Representative from California
 Arlen Specter, U.S. Senator from Pennsylvania
 Pete Wilson, Governor of California
 Morry Taylor, CEO from Michigan

Candidates gallery

A number of Republican candidates entered the field to challenge the incumbent Democratic president, Bill Clinton.

The fragmented field of candidates debated issues such as a flat tax and other tax cut proposals, and a return to supply-side economic policies popularized by Ronald Reagan. More attention was drawn to the race by the budget stalemate in 1995 between Congress and the President, which caused temporary shutdowns and slowdowns in many areas of federal government service.

Former Secretary of Labor Lynn Martin of Illinois, who served in the United States House of Representatives from Illinois's 16th District and was the 1990 Republican U.S. Senate nominee losing to incumbent Paul Simon conducted a bid for most of 1995, but withdrew before the Iowa caucuses as polls showed her languishing far behind. She participated in a number of primary Presidential debates before withdrawing. Martin's predecessor in Congress, John Anderson had made first a Republican then Independent Presidential bid in 1980. Also, Simon who defeated Martin for the U.S. Senate had run for president as a Democrat in 1988.

Former U.S. Army General Colin Powell was widely courted as a potential Republican nominee. However, on November 8, 1995, Powell announced that he would not seek the nomination. Former Secretary of Defense and future Vice President of the United States Dick Cheney was touted by many as a possible candidate for the presidency, but he declared his intentions not to run in early 1995. Former and future Defense Secretary Donald Rumsfeld formed a presidential campaign exploratory committee, but declined to formally enter the race. Former Secretary of State James A. Baker III and former Secretary of Education William Bennett both flirted with bids, both even set up exploratory committees, for a number of months but both finally declared within days of each other they would not run either.

Primaries and convention

Ahead of the 1996 primary contest, Republican Leader of the United States Senate and former vice-presidential candidate Bob Dole was seen as the most likely winner. However, Steve Forbes finished first in Delaware and Arizona while paleoconservative firebrand Pat Buchanan managed early victories in Alaska and Louisiana, in addition to a strong second place in the Iowa caucuses and a surprising victory in the small but key New Hampshire primary.  Buchanan's New Hampshire win alarmed the Republican "establishment" sufficiently as to provoke prominent Republicans to quickly coalesce around Dole, and Dole won every primary starting with North and South Dakota. Dole resigned his Senate seat on June 11 and the Republican National Convention formally nominated Dole on August 15, 1996, for president.

Popular primaries vote:
 Bob Dole – 8,427,601 (59.2%)
 Pat Buchanan – 3,021,935 (21.2%)
 Steve Forbes – 1,425,998 (10.0%)
 Lamar Alexander – 495,590 (3.5%)
 Alan Keyes – 449,536 (3.2%)
 Richard Lugar – 127,111 (0.9%)
 Unpledged – 123,765 (0.9%)
 Phil Gramm – 71,457 (0.5%)
 Bob Dornan – 42,141 (0.3%)
 Morry Taylor – 21,180 (0.1%)

Convention tally:
 Bob Dole – 1928
 Pat Buchanan – 43
 Phil Gramm – 2
 Alan Keyes – 1
 Robert Bork – 1
 Not voting – 15

Former Representative and Housing Secretary Jack Kemp was nominated by acclamation for vice president, the following day. This was the only Republican ticket between 1980 and 2008 that did not include a member of the Bush family.

Reform Party nomination

Candidates gallery

The United States Reform Party had great difficulty in finding a candidate willing to run in the general election. Lowell Weicker, Tim Penny, David Boren and Richard Lamm were among those who toyed with the notion of seeking its presidential nomination, though all but Lamm decided against it; Lamm had himself come close to withdrawing his name from consideration. Lamm designated Ed Zschau as his vice presidential candidate.

Ultimately, the Reform Party nominated its founder Ross Perot from Texas in its first election as an official political party. Although Perot easily won the nomination, his victory at the party's national convention led to a schism as supporters of Lamm accused him of rigging the vote to prevent them from casting their ballots. This faction walked out of the national convention and eventually formed their own group, the American Reform Party, and attempted to convince Lamm to run as an Independent in the general election; Lamm declined, pointing out a promise he made before running that he would respect the Party's final decision.

Economist Pat Choate was nominated for Vice President.

Minor parties and independents 

Parties in this section obtained ballot access in enough states to theoretically obtain the minimum number of electoral votes needed to win the election. Individuals included in this section completed one or more of the following actions: received, or formally announced their candidacy for, the presidential nomination of a third party; formally announced intention to run as an independent candidate and obtained enough ballot access to win the election; filed as a third party or non-affiliated candidate with the FEC (for other than exploratory purposes). Within each party, candidates are listed alphabetically by surname.

Libertarian Party nomination

Libertarian candidates
 Harry Browne – writer and investment analyst from Tennessee
 Rick Tompkins – former candidate for Senator from Arizona
 Irwin Schiff – writer and prominent figure in the tax protester movement from Nevada
 Douglas J. Ohmen – political activist from California
 Jeffrey Diket – political activist from Louisiana

The Libertarian Party nominated free-market writer and investment analyst, Harry Browne from Tennessee, and selected Jo Jorgensen from South Carolina as his running-mate. Browne and Jorgensen drew 485,798 votes (0.5% of the popular vote).

Green Party nomination

The Green Party of the United States – Ralph Nader of Connecticut was drafted as a candidate for President of the United States on the Green Party ticket. He was not formally nominated by the Green Party USA, which was, at the time, the largest national Green group; instead, he was nominated independently by various state Green parties (in some areas, he appeared on the ballot as an independent). Nader vowed to spend only $5,000 in his election campaign (to avoid having to file a financial statement with the FEC). Winona LaDuke, a Native American activist and economist from Wisconsin, was named as his running-mate. In Iowa and Vermont, Anne Goeke was listed as Nader's running mate; in New Jersey it was Madelyn Hoffman and in New York it was Muriel Tillinghast.

Nader and his running mates drew 685,128 votes (0.71% of the popular vote).

Natural Law Party nomination

The Natural Law Party for a second time nominated scientist and researcher John Hagelin for president and Mike Tompkins for vice president. The party platform included preventive health care, sustainable agriculture and renewable energy technologies. During his campaigns, Hagelin favored abortion rights without public financing, campaign finance law reform, improved gun control, a flat tax, the eradication of PACs, a ban on soft money contributions, and school vouchers, and was a believer in "yogic flying."

Hagelin and Tompkins drew 113,671 votes (0.1% of the popular vote).

U.S. Taxpayers' Party nomination

The U.S. Taxpayers Party had run its first presidential ticket in 1992, it being head by Howard Phillips who had failed to find any prominent conservative willing to take the mantle. In 1996 the situation ultimately proved the same, though Pat Buchanan for a time was widely speculated to be planning on bolting to the Taxpayers' Party should the expected Republican nominee, Senator Bob Dole, name a pro-choice running-mate. When Jack Kemp, who opposed abortion, was tapped for the position Buchanan agreed to endorse the Republican ticket. Again, Phillips found himself at a temporary post that was made permanent, with Herbert Titus being nominated for the Vice Presidency.

Phillips and Titus drew 182,820 votes (0.2% of the popular vote).

General election

Campaign
Without meaningful primary opposition, Clinton was able to focus on the general election early, while Dole was forced to move to the right and spend his campaign reserves fighting off challengers. Political adviser Dick Morris urged Clinton to raise huge sums of campaign funds via soft money for an unprecedented early TV blitz of swing states promoting Clinton's agenda and record. As a result, Clinton could run a campaign through the summer defining his opponent as an aged conservative far from the mainstream before Dole was in a position to respond. Compared to the 50-year-old Clinton, then 73-year-old Dole appeared especially old and frail, as illustrated by an embarrassing fall off a stage during a campaign event in Chico, California. Dole further enhanced this contrast on September 18 when he made a reference to a no-hitter thrown the day before by Hideo Nomo of the "Brooklyn Dodgers", a team that had left Brooklyn for Los Angeles 38 years earlier. A few days later Dole would make a joke about the remark by saying, "And I'd like to congratulate the St. Louis Cardinals on winning the N.L. Central. Notice I said the St. Louis Cardinals, not the St. Louis Browns." (The Browns had left St. Louis after the 1954 season to become the Baltimore Orioles.)

Dole chose to focus on Clinton as being "part of the spoiled baby boomer generation" and stating, "My generation won [World War II], and we may need to be called to service one last time." Although his message won appeal with older voters, surveys found that his age was widely held as a liability and his frequent allusions to WWII and the Great Depression in speeches and campaign ads "unappealing" to younger voters. To prove that he was still healthy and active, Dole released all of his medical records to the public and published photographs of himself running on a treadmill. After the falling incident in California, he joked that he "was trying to do that new Democratic dance, the macarena."

The Clinton campaign avoided mentioning Dole's age directly, instead choosing to confront it in more subtle ways such as the campaign slogan "Building Bridges to the Future" in contrast to the Republican candidate's frequent remarks that he was a "bridge to the past", before the social upheavals of the 1960s. Clinton, without actually calling Dole old, questioned the age of his ideas.

With respect to the issues, Dole promised a 15% across-the-board reduction in income tax rates and made former Congressman and supply side advocate Jack Kemp his running mate. Bill Clinton framed the narrative against Dole early, painting him as a mere clone of unpopular House Speaker Newt Gingrich, warning America that Bob Dole would work in concert with the Republican Congress to slash popular social programs, like Medicare and Social Security, dubbed by Clinton as "Dole-Gingrich". Bob Dole's tax-cut plan found itself under attack from the White House, who said it would "blow a hole in the deficit," which had been cut nearly in half during his opponent's term.

The televised debates featured only Dole and Clinton, locking out Perot and the other minor candidates from the discussion. Perot, who had been allowed to participate in the 1992 debates, would eventually take his case to court, seeking damages from not being in the debate, as well as citing unfair coverage from the major media outlets.

In a first for either major party in a presidential election, both the Clinton and Dole campaigns had official websites. Dole invited viewers to visit his "homepage" at the end of the first debate.

Throughout the campaign, Clinton maintained leads in the polls over Dole and Perot, generally by large margins. In October, Republican National Committee "operatives urg[ed] their party's Congressional candidates to cut loose from Bob Dole and press voters to maintain a Republican majority" and spent $4 million on advertising in targeted districts.

Presidential debates 

Three debates, organized by the Commission on Presidential Debates, took place—two between the presidential candidates and one between the vice presidential candidates:

Campaign donations controversy 

In late September 1995, questions arose regarding the Democratic National Committee's fund-raising practices. In February the following year, China's alleged role in the campaign finance controversy first gained public attention after The Washington Post published a story stating that a U.S. Department of Justice investigation had discovered evidence that agents of China sought to direct contributions from foreign sources to the DNC before the 1996 presidential campaign. The paper wrote that intelligence information had showed the Chinese Embassy in Washington, D.C. was used for coordinating contributions to the DNC in violation of U.S. law forbidding non-American citizens from giving monetary donations to U.S. politicians and political parties. Seventeen people were eventually convicted for fraud or for funneling Asian funds into the U.S. elections.

One of the more notable events learned involved Vice President Al Gore and a fund-raising event held at Hsi Lai Temple in Hacienda Heights, California. The Temple event was organized by DNC fund-raisers John Huang and Maria Hsia. It is illegal under U.S. law for religious organizations to donate money to politicians or political groups due to their tax-exempt status. The U.S. Justice Department alleged Hsia facilitated $100,000 in illegal contributions to the 1996 Clinton-Gore re-election campaign through her efforts at the Temple. Hsia was eventually convicted by a jury in March 2000. The DNC eventually returned the money donated by the Temple's monks and nuns. Twelve nuns and employees of the Temple refused to answer questions by pleading the Fifth Amendment when they were subpoenaed to testify before Congress in 1997.

Results
On election day, President Clinton won a decisive victory over Dole, becoming the first Democrat to win two consecutive presidential elections since Franklin D. Roosevelt in 1936, 1940, and 1944. In the popular vote, he out-polled Dole by over 8.2 million votes. The Electoral College map did not change much from the previous election, with the Democratic incumbent winning 379 votes to the Republican ticket's 159. In the West, Dole managed to narrowly win Colorado and Montana (both had voted for Clinton four years earlier), while Clinton became the first Democrat to win Arizona since Harry Truman in 1948. In the South, Clinton won Florida, a state he had failed to win in 1992, but lost Georgia, a state that he had carried. The election helped to cement Democratic presidential control in California, Vermont, Maine, Illinois, New Jersey and Connecticut; all went on to vote Democratic in every subsequent presidential election after having voted Republican in the five prior to 1992. 1996 marked the first time that Vermont voted for a Democrat in two successive elections. Pennsylvania and Michigan both voted Democratic, and would remain in the Democratic presidential fold until 2016.

Although Clinton's margin of victory in the popular vote was slightly greater than that of George H.W. Bush eight years prior, he won fewer states and electoral votes, in part due to his relatively poor performance in areas of low population density – a precursor of the trend where future Democratic contenders for the presidency perform very well in populous metropolitan areas but vastly underperform in rural counties.

Reform Party nominee Ross Perot won approximately 8% of the popular vote. His vote total was less than half of his performance in 1992. The 1996 national exit poll showed that just as in 1992, Perot drew supporters from Clinton and Dole equally. In polls directed at Perot voters as to who would be a second choice, Clinton consistently held substantial leads. Perot's best showing was in states that tended to strongly favor either Clinton (such as Maine) or Dole (particularly Montana, though the margin of victory there was much closer). Perot once again received his lowest amount of support in the South.

Although Clinton is a native of Arkansas, and his running mate hailed from Tennessee, the Democratic ticket again carried just four of the eleven states of the former Confederacy. This tied Clinton's 1992 run for the weakest performance by a winning Democratic presidential candidate in the region before 2000 (in terms of states won). Clinton's performance seems to have been part of a broader decline in support for the Democratic Party in the South. In the 2000 and 2004 elections, the Democrats would fail to carry even one of the former Confederate states, contributing to their defeat both times. This completed the Republican takeover of the American South, a region in which Democrats had held a near monopoly from 1880 to 1948. However, in 2008, the Democrats were able to win three former Confederate states (Virginia, North Carolina, and Florida), but that was still worse than Clinton's performances in both 1992 and 1996. Since 1984, no winning presidential candidate has surpassed Bill Clinton's 8.5 percentage popular vote margin, or his 220 electoral vote margin since 1988. Additionally, since 1964, no other Democratic presidential candidate has surpassed Clinton's electoral vote margin and, except Lyndon B. Johnson in that election, no Democratic presidential candidate has surpassed Clinton's 8.5 percentage popular vote margin since 1940.

The election was also notable for the fact that for the first time in U.S. history the winner was elected without winning the male vote and the third time in U.S. history that a candidate was elected president twice without receiving an absolute majority of the popular vote in either election (Grover Cleveland and Woodrow Wilson are the others, although all three won pluralities, i.e. the most votes).

Clinton was the first Democrat to win re-election to the presidency since Franklin D. Roosevelt, and the first Southern Democrat to win re-election since Andrew Jackson in 1832. Following the 2020 election, 1996 remains the last time the following states voted Democratic: Arkansas, Kentucky, Louisiana, Missouri, Tennessee, and West Virginia. Clinton also remains the last presidential candidate of either party to win at least one county in every state. Clinton was also the last Democrat to win Arizona until 2020.

Official Source (Popular Vote): 1996 Official Presidential General Election Results

Source (popular and electoral vote): Federal Elections Commission Electoral and Popular Vote Summary
unofficial
Secondary Source (Popular Vote): 

Voting age population: 196,498,000

Percent of voting age population casting a vote for President: 49.00%

Results by state

Maine and Nebraska district results
†Maine and Nebraska each allow for their electoral votes to be split between candidates. In both states, two electoral votes are awarded to the winner of the statewide race and one electoral vote is awarded to the winner of each congressional district.

Close states
State where the margin of victory was under 1% (8 electoral votes):
 Kentucky, 0.96% (13,331 votes)

States where the margin of victory was under 5% (109 electoral votes):
 Nevada, 1.02% (4,730 votes)
 Georgia, 1.17% (26,994 votes)
 Colorado, 1.37% (20,696 votes)
 Virginia, 1.96% (47,290 votes)
 Arizona, 2.22% (31,215 votes)
 Tennessee, 2.41% (45,616 votes)
 Montana, 2.88% (11,730 votes)
 South Dakota, 3.46% (11,210 votes)
 North Carolina, 4.69% (118,089 votes)
 Texas, 4.93% (276,484 votes)

States where the margin of victory was between 5% and 10% (143 electoral votes):
 Mississippi, 5.13% (45,816 votes)
 Indiana, 5.58% (119,269 votes)
 Florida, 5.70% (302,334 votes)
 South Carolina, 6.04% (69,407 votes)
 Missouri, 6.30% (135,919 votes)
 Ohio, 6.36% (288,339 votes)
 North Dakota, 6.81% (18,145 votes)
 Alabama, 6.96% (106,879 votes)
 New Mexico, 7.32% (40,744 votes)
 Oklahoma, 7.81% (94,210 votes)
 Oregon, 8.09% (111,489 votes)
 Pennsylvania, 9.20% (414,650 votes) (tipping point state)
 New Hampshire, 9.95% (49,682 votes)

Statistics 

Counties with Highest Percent of Vote (Democratic)
 Starr County, Texas 86.94%
 Bronx County, New York 85.80%
 Macon County, Alabama 85.55%
 Washington, D.C. 85.19%
 Duval County, Texas 84.94%

Counties with Highest Percent of Vote (Republican)
 Ochiltree County, Texas 79.20%
 Russell County, Kansas 78.98%
 Glasscock County, Texas 78.93%
 Hayes County, Nebraska 77.02%
 Sioux County, Iowa 77.00%

Counties with Highest Percent of Vote (Other)
 Mineral County, Montana 23.72%
 Grant County, North Dakota 21.55%
 Shoshone County, Idaho 21.55%
 Sanders County, Montana 21.24%
 Billings County, North Dakota 21.10%

Voter demographics

Source: Voter News Service exit poll, reported in The New York Times, November 10, 1996, 28.

Polling controversy
The polling in the election was criticized by Everett Carll Ladd, who argued that "polls had overestimated Clinton's lead during the campaign and had thereby dampened interest in the election." Others such as Warren J. Mitofsky rebutted Ladd's view; in an analysis in Public Opinion Quarterly, Mitofsky wrote that "1996 was not the best but was far from the worst year for the polls", with accuracy surpassing the polling in 1948 and in 1980. Because Clinton won the election by a comfortable margin, there was no major reaction towards the impreciseness of the polls.

See also
 List of presidents of the United States
 Second inauguration of Bill Clinton
 Newspaper endorsements in the 1996 United States presidential election
 1996 United States gubernatorial elections
 1996 United States House of Representatives elections
 1996 United States Senate elections

Notes

References

Further reading

Books

Journals
 Immelman, Aubrey. "The political personalities of 1996 US presidential candidates Bill Clinton and Bob Dole." Leadership Quarterly 9.3 (1998): 335–366. online

Web references

External links
 Campaign websites
 Clinton-Gore 1996 website screen shots 
  (as of 1996)
 Dole-Kemp 1996 website (still active as of February 2021)

 Other links
 The Election Wall's 1996 Election Video Page
 1996 popular vote by counties
 1996 popular vote by states
 1996 popular vote by states (with bar graphs)
 CNN: 1996 Presidential Campaign Ads
 Popular vote data from the Federal Election Commission
  – MTV pages on the election
 
Documentary about the 1996 Vice Presidential Candidates, "Running Mate," 1996-10-01, The Walter J. Brown Media Archives & Peabody Awards Collection at the University of Georgia, American Archive of Public Broadcasting

 
United States
Bill Clinton
Al Gore
Ross Perot
Bob Dole
November 1996 events in the United States
Foreign electoral intervention
Jack Kemp